The following tables show the England national football team's all-time international record. The statistics are composed of FIFA World Cup, UEFA European Football Championship, UEFA Nations League and British Home Championship (1883–1984) matches, as well as numerous international friendly tournaments and matches.

England played the world's first international fixture against Scotland on 30 November 1872, which ended in a 0–0 draw. England and Scotland have since contested 115 official matches: England have won 48, Scotland have won 41 and 26 have been drawn.

England have contested matches against more than 80 other national teams. England are unbeaten against 54 of them, having earned a perfect winning percentage against 30 of these teams. England have never beaten five teams that they have played at least once: Algeria, Ghana, Honduras, Saudi Arabia and South Korea. England have played all of these teams only once, with the exception of Saudi Arabia (two matches), and all of their meetings have been draws.

England have a negative record (more losses than wins) against only four countries: Brazil, Italy, the Netherlands and Uruguay. England have never lost to an African or Asian country.

Performances
Last match updated on 10 December 2022

Performance by competition

Performance by manager

Performance by venue

Competition records

FIFA World Cup

UEFA European Championship

UEFA Nations League

Minor tournaments

Head-to-head record

Last match updated on 10 December 2022

Combined predecessor and successor records

List of FIFA members who have never played against England

AFC

CAF

CONCACAF

CONMEBOL

OFC

UEFA

Notes

References 

England national football team records and statistics
National association football team all-time records